Hey! Album is the second album by the Atlanta rock band Marvelous 3. It was released by the band's Marvelous Records in 1998. Elektra Records picked it up for an early 1999 release, for which the band rerecorded about 40 percent of the album.

Critical reception
The Los Angeles Times wrote that the band "concocts an often fetching blend of glam-tinged power-pop and Elvis Costello-style gibes."

AllMusic called Hey! Album "a likeable, melodic album, full of self-conscious and self-deprecating lyrics bordering on preciousness."

Track listing
All songs written by Butch Walker.

Official studio release
 "You're So Yesterday" - 3:56
 "Freak of the Week" - 3:20
 "Until You See" - 4:20
 "Write it on Your Hand" - 3:23
 "Let Me Go" - 3:21
 "Every Monday" - 3:06
 "Indie Queen" - 4:52
 "#27" - 2:51
 "Mrs. Jackson" - 3:33
 "Over Your Head" - 3:40
 "Vampires in Love" - 4:01
 "Lemonade" - 6:42

Original independent release
 "You're So Yesterday"
 "Freak of the Week"
 "Until You See"
 "Let Me Go"
 "Every Monday"
 "Indie Queen"
 "Lemonade"
 "#27"
 "Just Wanna Go Home"
 "Over Your Head"
 "Mrs. Jackson"
 "Fastboat"
 "Cold As Hell"

References

1998 albums
Marvelous 3 albums